Dactylorhiza majalis subsp. traunsteinerioides, known as the narrow-leaved marsh-orchid and Pugsley's marsh orchid, is a subspecies of Dactylorhiza majalis (the western marsh-orchid) found only in Britain and Ireland. It is also treated as the species  Dactylorhiza traunsteinerioides.

Description
The labellum is reddish-purple, usually with dark markings reaching to the edges.

Taxonomy
The taxon was first given a scientific name in 1936 by H. W. Pugsley; he described plants found in Britain and Ireland as Orchis majalis subsp. traunsteinerioides (Orchis majalis being the name used at the time for the species now called Dactylorhiza majalis). In 1940, Pugsley raised it from a subspecies to the full species Orchis traunsteineriodes. The marsh-orchids were later separated as the genus Dactylorhiza, and in 1947 Pieter Vermeulen first transferred the taxon to Dactylorhiza traunsteineriodes. This name continues to be used by Clive Stace in the 2010 edition of New Flora of the British Isles. Other current sources consider it to be the subspecies Dactylorhiza majalis subsp. traunsteineri.

The narrow lower leaves of D. majalis subsp. traunsteineriodes distinguish it from other Dactylorhiza taxa found in Britain and Ireland with the exception of D. majalis subsp. ebudensis (syn. D. ebudensis). The latter is found only on North Uist in the Outer Hebrides of Scotland and has heavily spotted stem leaves and a less trilobed labellum, with a shorter central lobe, although genetic studies published in 2011 suggest that it is not distinct from D. majalis subsp. traunsteineriodes. Plants found in Britain and Ireland and identified as Dactylorhiza traunsteineri or Dactylorhiza lapponica belong to this taxon, neither species being found in these countries.

Distribution and habitat
D. majalis subsp. traunsteinerioides is endemic to Great Britain and western Ireland. It is found in damp base-rich locations, including calcareous fens. Stace (2010) gives its distribution within Britain as "especially East Anglia, Yorkshire, north Wales and western Scotland". On the basis of genetic studies, Hedrén et al. (2011) say that plants attributed to subsp. traunsteinerioides found below a line extending from the mid-Wales coast to the Humber Estuary in Yorkshire actually belong to subsp. praetermissa.

References

majalis traunsteinerioides
Plant subspecies